Jammeh is a surname. Notable people with the surname include:

Abdou Jammeh (born 1986), Gambian football player
Haruna Jammeh (born 1991), Gambian football player
Katrin Stjernfeldt Jammeh (born 1974), Swedish politician
Ken Jammeh (born 1987), Gambian football player
Ousman Jammeh (born 1953), Gambian politician
Yahya Jammeh (born 1965), president of Gambia, 1994–2017